Lonchurus is a genus of fish in the family Sciaenidae. Species are found in the Western Atlantic.

References 

Sciaenidae
Perciformes genera